Phrynobatrachus graueri is a species of frog in the family Phrynobatrachidae. It is found in eastern Democratic Republic of the Congo, Rwanda, Uganda, and western Kenya. The specific name graueri honours Rudolf Grauer, Austrian explorer and zoologist who collected the holotype. Common names Rugege river frog and Grauer's puddle frog have been coined for it.

Description
The snout is short. The tympanum is distinct and about one-half of the eye width. The fingers and toes have distinct discs. The toes are slightly webbed. The dorsum is dark olive. A darker band runs from the nostril to the forearm. There might be a narrow or wide vertebral stripe. A pair of light lines are flanking the vent. Males have black throat. The base of the hind limb is often yellow.

Habitat and conservation
The eggs are deposited in water, generally in swampy situations. Where present, it is a common species. It is probably affected by habitat loss caused by agriculture, livestock, wood extraction, and human settlements. It is present in the Kibale and Bwindi National Parks in Uganda and Kakamega National Reserve in Kenya.

References

graueri
Frogs of Africa
Amphibians of the Democratic Republic of the Congo
Amphibians of Kenya
Amphibians of Rwanda
Amphibians of Uganda
Amphibians described in 1911
Taxa named by Fritz Nieden
Taxonomy articles created by Polbot